Finbow is a surname. Notable people with the surname include:

 David Finbow (born 1968), British snooker player
 Peter Finbow (born 1975), British wheelchair basketball player
 Ross Finbow (born 1982), British film and TV actor

English toponymic surnames